Oxegen 2011 was the eighth Oxegen festival to take place since 2004. It took place on the weekend of Friday 8 July, Saturday, 9 July and Sunday, 10 July at Punchestown Racecourse near Naas in County Kildare, Ireland. Arctic Monkeys, Beyoncé, Black Eyed Peas, Coldplay, Foo Fighters and The Strokes were among the headlining acts.
On the final night of the festival Christy Moore came on stage to sing with headliners Coldplay at the end of their set.

Tickets
Early bird tickets were released for purchase on 15 December 2010, with a four-day camping pass available with a discount of €25. General tickets were scheduled to go on sale in March 2011, and did so immediately after the festival's official launch on 8 March with  four day camping ticket costing €244.50.

Promoters MCD spent a lot of money on advertising the 2011 festival, with ticket sales being slow.

Official announcements
On 13 December 2010, Foo Fighters was announced as one of the headline acts of the 2011 festival, the first act to be announced. The band's album was scheduled to be released prior to the performance. On 14 December, Arctic Monkeys became the second headline act to be announced. It was scheduled to be their first performance at Oxegen since 2006. On 15 December, Blink-182 was announced to play the festival for the first time. It had seldom performed in Ireland in the previous 15 years. On 16 December, Paolo Nutini was announced, having performed at the festival in 2010. On 22 December, The Black Eyed Peas was announced, having also performed at the festival in 2010.

On 8 March 2011, the festival was officially launched, with Coldplay announced as the bill-toppers in what would be their first appearance at Oxegen. Dave Grohl hosted the presentation of the announcement on the festival's official website. Other artists to be added included Bruno Mars, All Time Low, Brandon Flowers, Beady Eye, Swedish House Mafia, My Chemical Romance, Weezer, Plan B, Tinie Tempah, Primal Scream, Two Door Cinema Club, Eels, Calvin Harris, Jimmy Eat World, Hurts, Ryan Sheridan, Bipolar Empire. Bright Eyes, The Bloody Beetroots, Paolo Nutini, The National, Deadmau5, Pendulum, Leftfield, Imelda May, Eels, The Vaccines, Noah and the Whale, Tiga, Sven Väth, Friendly Fires, Crystal Castles, Afrojack, Chase & Status, Ocean Colour Scene, Fight Like Apes, The Naked and Famous, Mona, Fun Lovin' Criminals, Royseven, Fenech-Soler, Madisun, Consumer Love Affair.

Slash, OFWGKTA, Metronomy, Manic Street Preachers, Glasvegas, The Saturdays, Peter Doherty, The Pretty Reckless, Professor Green, Ke$ha, Eliza Doolittle, Example and Cherri Bomb were officially added to the line-up on 18 April.
 
Blink-182, earlier announced as a headline act announced on 18 April that they were moving their European tour to 2012. So therefore have pulled out of this year's Oxegen festival.

Beyoncé was officially added to the line-up on 5 May. She, along with Coldplay, performed at the 2011 Glastonbury Festival ahead of Oxegen, leading to reports that tickets would start selling quickly again.

On 31 May, the Red Bull Electric Ballroom was launched.

On 27 June, the stage breakdown was announced. On 30 June, the stage times were announced.

Jessie J was forced to cancel her appearance at Oxegen 2011 due to a broken leg.

Signing tent
The Hot Press Signing Tent returned. It featured Two Door Cinema Club, Peter Hook, Royseven, Ryan Sheridan, Friendly Fires and Bressie. Goody bags also featured.

Broadcasting rights
RTÉ 2fm broadcast more than 30 hours of live coverage throughout Oxegen 2011. RTÉ set up a live Oxegen website to share its content between RTÉ Ten, RTÉ.ie, RTÉ 2fm's YouTube channel and RTÉ News Now.

Incidents
On the first day of the festival a teenager from Wexford was slashed with a knife after being set upon by a group in the festival campsite. Overall the Gardaí made a total of 90 arrests at the festival over the weekend, including assault, theft and drink-driving. There were also 308 drug seizures, and 28 arrests for alleged drug dealing.

Stages
Oxegen 2011 had at least five stages, minus one from the previous year. The Redbull Electric Ballroom appeared for the first time.
 The Main Stage was headlined by The Black Eyed Peas, Foo Fighters with Beyoncé and Coldplay.
 The Vodafone Stage was headlined by Swedish House Mafia, Deadmau5 and Pendulum.
 Heineken Green Spheres was headlined by Leftfield, Propaganda DJs and Primal Scream.
 The 2FM/Hot Press Academy was headlined by Glasvegas, Eels and Bright Eyes.
 The Redbull Electric Ballroom was headlined by Sven Väth, The Bloody Beetroots and Afrojack.

Day/Stage Breakdown + Times

Aftermath
OFWGKTA announced a performance at The Academy in Dublin on 23 August.
Calvin Harris announced a show at Mandela Hall, Belfast in September.
Noah and the Whale announced two performances in October. One in Mandela Hall, Belfast and one at Dublin's Olympia Theatre.
Dublin band The Minutes will perform at The Academy, Dublin on 15 October.
City and Colour announced they will play The Academy, Dublin on 20 October.
Patrick Wolf announced a performance at The Speakeasy, Belfast on 23 October and The Academy Dublin on 24 October.
The Naked and Famous announced a performance at Dublin's Olympia Theatre on 13 November.
Example announced he would play The Olympia Theatre in Dublin on 30 November.
Friendly Fires will perform at Dublin's Olympia Theatre on 7 December.
The Saturdays announced two shows in December at The Odyssey Arena, Befast and The O2 in Dublin.

References

External links
 Official website
 Official broadcaster site (MTV)
 Oxegen 2011 RTÉ Site

11
2011 in Irish music
2011 music festivals